Yesterdays is a live jazz album by Keith Jarrett, Gary Peacock, and Jack DeJohnette recorded in concert on April 30, 2001 at the Metropolitan Festival Hall in Tokyo and also at the sound-check recording of April 24, 2001 at the Orchard Hall in Tokyo that would give way to Always Let Me Go. It was released by ECM Records in 2009.

Reception 

In a review for AllMusic, Thom Jurek wrote: "What is most remarkable about this band is its sense of balance between eloquence, interplay, improvisational communication, and swing. This group is not only a solid link to the tradition Jarrett, Peacock, and DeJohnette all came up with, but it is a solid teaching pointer as to how to employ standards for the music in the future."

Writing for All About Jazz, John Kelman commented: "No matter how well-heeled some of the material is, there's always a unique charm brought to each release in the trio's growing discography. Jarrett, bassist Gary Peacock, and drummer Jack DeJohnette continue to find new ways to respect the material, all the while keeping it fresh—infused with rarified nuance and an ever-present sound of surprise. The relevance of a good song never fades, as long as there are players who can find new ways to explore its full depth and breadth... This trio may be 25 years old, but Jarrett, Peacock, and DeJohnette are showing absolutely no signs of losing their edge or relevance."

Tyran Grillo, in an article for Between Sound and Space, stated: "Yesterdays follows Always Let Me Go, The Out-of-Towners, and My Foolish Heart... as the fourth and final ECM album recorded during Keith Jarrett, Gary Peacock, and Jack DeJohnette’s inaugural tour of the new millennium. Like beads on a necklace, these albums guide a singular thread, a development of attitude and polish, which colors the music of this enduring trio. Pianist, bassist, and drummer respectively buff another set of standards to a sheen of crystalline ebullience... Track for track, a solid outing, with soft spots in all the right places."

Track listing
"Strollin'" (Horace Silver) – 8:12
"You Took Advantage of Me" (Rodgers, Hart) – 10:12
"Yesterdays" (Kern, Harbach) – 8:55
"Shaw'nuff" (Gillespie, Parker) – 6:10
"You've Changed" (Fischer, Carey) – 7:55
"Scrapple from the Apple" (Parker) – 9:01
"A Sleepin' Bee" (Arlen, Capote) – 8:17
"Intro / Smoke Gets In Your Eyes" (Jarrett / Kern, Harbach) – 8:47
"Stella by Starlight" (Young, Washington) – 8:04
Total playing time: 1:11:20 (the album contains 4:17 applause approximately)

Personnel 
 Keith Jarrett – piano
Gary Peacock – double bass
Jack DeJohnette – drums

Production
 Keith Jarrett – producer
 Manfred Eicher - producer, editing & mastering
 Toshinari Koinuma - concert producer
 Yoshihiro Suzuki - recording engineer
 Jan Erik Kongshaug - editing & mastering
 Sascha Kleis - design
 Thomas Wunsch - cover photo
 Patrick Hinley - liner photos

References 

Standards Trio albums
Gary Peacock live albums
Jack DeJohnette live albums
Keith Jarrett live albums
2009 live albums
ECM Records live albums
Albums produced by Manfred Eicher